The Royal Ann or Royal Anne (also called Napoleon, Napoleon Bigarreau and Queen Anne) is a variety of cherry, similar in appearance and taste to the 'Rainier cherry'.

Biology

About Royal Ann 
Royal Ann cherry trees are perennial semi-dwarfs that bloom early April with harvest in mid-summer. They are deciduous trees that can be characterized by dark green leaves and clusters of small fragrant white flowers that are about 2.5-3 centimeters wide. Royal Ann flowers are hermaphroditic, containing both male and female reproductive organs, however, the tree cannot self-pollinate. Another pollinator species is necessary in order for fertilization to occur, most commonly bees. Each flower goes on to produce a single Royal Ann cherry. A mature fruit producing Royal Ann tree is about 12–15 feet in height. The trees prefer a half to full day of sun, and soil with good drainage. Royal Ann trees require a temperate climate, where the average winter temperature does not drop below 10 degrees Fahrenheit.

Royal Ann cherries are fleshy stone fruits similar in size to most cherry varieties, and are yellow to light pink colored. Royal Ann fruits are often mistaken for Rainier cherries because of their similar appearance and taste. Trees produce fruit within 1–3 years after planting and are considered fully mature around 8 years old. Royal Ann trees can produce up to 50 pounds of cherries per season.

Nutrient content 
Cherries are famous for containing high levels of antioxidants, which are substances that inhibit oxidation in living organisms. Sweet cherries, like the Royal Ann are also high in sugars, like glucose, fructose, sucrose, and sorbitol. Organic acids in sweet cherries include malic, citric, shikimic, and fumaric.

Stone fruits are known to contain toxic compounds that produce hydrogen cyanide, which is toxic or lethal in large doses. These compounds can be found in the bark, flowers, seeds, and leaves of cherry trees. Children have been poisoned in the past by eating or swallowing large amounts of seeds. Livestock have been killed by grazing on branches and leaves.

Domestication 
It is thought that cherries first originated in Turkey, near the Black Sea. Cultivation has been credited to the Greeks who helped the fruit spread through the Roman Empire and to England, where cherry trees were used as a food source and also for timber.

Sweet cherry trees were initially brought to the United States with the colonists in 1629. In 1847, Henderson Lewelling brought 700 fruit trees of Napoleon Bigarreau from Iowa to Oregon’s Willamette Valley to start a cherry orchard. Seth Lewelling joined his brother Henderson in 1850, he renamed the tree 'Royal Ann'. Seth later developed the Bing cherry.

Cultivation 
Sweet cherry trees are labeled as being very delicate and finicky. They are not a popular choice for growing with hobby gardeners because they can be very time consuming. Tips for facilitating growth and harvesting include bending the branches.

Sweet cherry trees grow vertically very quickly, as more nutrients from sunlight means a higher yield of fruits. However, the more vertical the tree is, the more foliage there is on the tree rather than fruit. By bending the branches at an angle of 30-60 degrees in relation to the trunk and anchoring them to the ground, the tree will produce more fruit and fewer leaves. Research findings show that bending branches slows the release of hormones coursing through the tree that are essential for fruit growth.

Pests, diseases, etc. 
Birds are the most common pest of cherry trees, seeking the sweet fruits. Birds can be repelled by using netting to cover trees in an orchard or deploying flash tape to scare them away.

Bacterial canker is a disease that can afflict all cherry trees, including Royal Ann trees. Signs of the disease include dead branches and brown colored damaged spots on branches or the trunk. Bacterial canker can be deterred by applying a copper spray to the trees in the fall and winter months.

Another common problem is rain splitting. This happens when the cherries are near ripe, and full of nutrients. With an excess of water intake, the skin of the fruit can no longer hold all of the nutrients and fluids and bursts open.

Human use 
Because of their firm and fleshy traits, Royal Ann cherries are ideal for home commercial and home canning. They’re often used for making pies, sauces, and jams because of their natural sweetness. Because Royal Ann cherries are so fragile, they make a great option for canning because the fruit is not being selected based on appearances as if it were freshly picked. Bruised Royal Ann cherries will taste the same mashed into a pie or in canned preserves.

Royal Ann cherries are also the ideal variety used to make maraschino cherries for cocktails and dishes. Royal Ann cherries are also excellent and sweet eaten fresh on their own.

References

Cherry cultivars